Benjamin Sum (born 27 November 2000) is a Burmese singer of ethnic Chin descent. He rose to prominence following his finish as the runner-up on the fourth season of Myanmar Idol.

Early life and education  
Benjamin Sum was born on 27 November 2000 in Kalay, Sagaing Region, Myanmar. His father was a missionary and died when he was four years old. His younger sister died at age four when he was eight years old, at the same time his mother diagnosed with cancer stage three when he was in middle school. His life story shocked the Myanmar audience as he stepped into Myanmar Idol 2019 as a contestant. He is currently studying Computer Science at University of Computer Studies, Kalay.

Career

MYANMAR IDOL JOURNEY 
Ben started performing in public in 2018. He wanted to pursue a career in music, and so he auditioned for the fourth season of Myanmar Idol. Finally, he was selected in Top 11 finalists.

He made the grand final on the weekend of 28 December 2019, alongside Esther Dawt Chin Sung and Aye Mya Phyu. After Esther was declared the winner, he finished as the runner-up with over 50% of the public vote. During his homecoming to Kalay a huge crowd of thousands fans gathered.

After competing Myanmar Idol, he started his tour to different cities in Myanmar. He began shooting for commercial advertisements, stage performances, and preparing to record his first solo album 

On 18 May 2020, he released a single song called "Pyan Twae Mae Yat" MV on his Facebook page which earned 1 M views within 24 hours and then 2M views in 5 days. Also it has long been number one on Joox's top 100 chart.

He also went to Australia to help the victims of the Australia Bushfires and raised a generous amounts for them just before the global pandemic in January 2020.

During the pandemic, he spent his days making songs and released a few of them which got charted No.1 in Joox

Despite his passion for making more music, he wasn't able to produce it due to the military coup.

MIZORAM JOURNEY 
After flying down to Mizoram, he released his first cover song 'Chhailai di lenna' in collaboration with Thangbawiha Chhakchhuak which was made for charity for Myanmar.

He then proceeded to make another video 'Tunah erawh zawng'  where he was noticed by a Mizo producer RPa Ralte  and got connected via youtube comments and continued to make an original song called 'Chhingmit in biahthu kan hlan' which hits 5M views till date. This was the turning point of his career in the Mizo Music Industry. Since then he has been performing in various platforms and even won the 'Best Male Artist' in Thazual and Lelte Awards in 2021, the very same year where he fleeted from Myanmar to Mizoram.

He also worked with one of the biggest record labels in Mizoram 'Kings & Prophets' where he released his first English original song 'Angel'  where he introduced himself as a grunge-punk artist and shocked the public with his new genre. He then released another music video 'Sam ang then zai i rel tawh mai ang'  which emotionally swayed the audience with the melodramatic lyrics, tune and the swooning vocals. He also worked with another talented artist, Saiwanah Sailo in a song called 'Khuanu Malsawmna' which was a huge hit as well.

Extended Play (EP) 
After releasing different singles, Benjamin Sum released an EP named 'Out Of The Blue' in December 9, 2022 which includes the following songs- 1. Cancer 2. Fire 3. Song For You 4. Feelings 5. I Wish 6. Run Away 

The content in this EP were all composed by him wherein he drew his inspiration from the people who are currently suffering a crisis back in his hometown. The genre in this EP is all Indie-pop-punk. While making this EP, Radwimps, Girl in Red, One OK Rock and Blink-182 were his muse.

ORANGE MUSIC FESTIVAL 
Benjamin Sum performed along with his band at Orange Festival in Dambuk, Arunachal Pradesh and got featured at Rolling Stones India where they wrote, "Myanmar-born, Mizoram artist Benjamin Sum – who had recently released his EP Out of the Blue – brought a raggedy pop-punk edge to the festival, matching the comedic heaviness of Green Day with jangly-pop and moving on to Radiohead-esque melancholy on “False Hope.” He included his most famous Mizo ballad to date, “Chhingmit In Biahthu Kan Hlan,” which was as grand as expected."Rolling Stone India"

Competition songs

Week 1:  He sang Mother how are you in Burmese version and he won the hearts of Myanmar audiences.
Week 2: He sang Ma Tar Nae (မတားနဲ့) which makes him the most popular contestant
Week 3:  He chose the song Adipati Lanma Ka Chay Yar Myar (အဓိပတိလမ်းမကခြေရာများ), Casablanca in Burmese version, for the week of College Student life.
Week 4: He chose the song Min Ma Shi Tae Nya Tway (မင်းမရှိတဲ့နေ့တွေ ညတွေ) in country theme.
Week 5: He sang Sate Pyay Thachin (စိတ်ဖြေသီချင်း) the week to the remembrance of the iconic singer Soe Lwin Lwin.
Week 6: He sang December Na Nat Khin (ဒီဇင်ဘာနံနက်ခင်း) for winter theme and he became a top 5 finalist.
Week 7: He sang Say (ဆေး) for popular song week and is chosen as one of the top 4 finalists.

Discography

Singles
 The Day We Meet Again (2020).
 Girl from the House Next Door (2020)

Award
Joox Top 10 Popular Song Award for 2020 
Joox Myanmar Half Year Artist Award 2020 (Rank 1) 
Shwe FM Music Award 2020 Most Requested Song on Shwe FM 
Chin TV Award 2020 Chin Artist of the year 2020 
Joox Popular Song Award ပြန်တွေ့မယ့်ရက် 
Padamyar FM Song of the Year Award 2020 ပြန်တွေ့မယ့်ရက် 
Chin TV Award 2021 Chin Person of the Year 
Thazual Award 2021 Best Male Artist Award (7th Annual Thazual Award) 
Hakha Times Award Chin Young Person of the Year 
Lelte Award 2021 Male Singer of the Year 
Chin TV Award 2022 Chin Humanitarian Award (Guys From Chin) 
ChinTube Award 2022 Most Influential Award (Guys From Chin) 
Moonlight Award 2022 Male Singer of the Year

References

External links
 
 
 
 

2000 births
Living people
21st-century Burmese male singers
Burmese singer-songwriters
Participants in Burmese reality television series
Burmese people of Chin descent
People from Sagaing Region